(also formerly known as alibata) is a Philippine script. The script is an abugida belonging to the family of the Brahmic scripts. Geographically, it was widely used in Luzon and other parts of the Philippines prior to and during the 16th and 17th centuries before being replaced by the Latin alphabet during the period of Spanish colonization. It was used in the Tagalog language and, to a lesser extent, Kapampangan-speaking areas; its use spread to the Ilocanos in the early 17th century. In the 19th and 20th centuries,  survived and evolved into multiple forms—the Tagbanwa script of Palawan, and the Hanuno'o and Buhid scripts of Mindoro—and was used to create the constructed modern Kulitan script of the Kapampangan and the Ibalnan script of the Palawan people. Under the Unicode Standard and ISO 15924, the script is encoded as the Tagalog block.

The chambers which house the writings are part of a tentative nomination to UNESCO World Heritage List that is still being deliberated on, along with the entire campus of the University of Santo Tomas.

Despite being primarily a historic script, the  script has seen some revival in the modern Philippines. Bills to require its use in certain cases and instruction in schools have been repeatedly considered by the Congress of the Philippines.

For modern computers and typing, characters are in the Unicode Basic Multilingual Plane (BMP) and were first proposed for encoding in 1998 by Michael Everson together with three other known indigenous scripts of the Philippines.

Terminology
The term  means "to write" or "to spell (syllabize)" in Tagalog.

The word  is also occasionally used to refer to the other indigenous writing systems of the Philippines, such as the Buhid, Hanunó'o, Tagbanwa, and Kulitan scripts, among others. Cultural organizations such as Sanghabi and the Heritage Conservation Society recommend that the collection of distinct scripts used by various indigenous groups in the Philippines, including , iniskaya, kirim jawi, and batang-arab be called suyat, which is a neutral collective noun for referring to any pre-Hispanic Philippine script.

 is occasionally referred to as alibata, a neologism coined by Paul Rodríguez Verzosa in 1914, after the first three letters of the Arabic script (the f in ʾalif having been dropped for euphony's sake), presumably under the erroneous assumption that  was derived from it. Most modern scholars reject the use of the word alibata as incorrect.

In modern times,  has been called badlit, kudlít-kabadlit by the Visayans, kurditan, kur-itan by the Ilocanos, and basahan by the Bicolanos.

Origins

Influence of Greater India

Historically Southeast Asia was under the influence of Ancient India, where numerous Indianized principalities and empires flourished for several centuries in Thailand, Indonesia, Malaysia, Singapore, Philippines, Cambodia and Vietnam. The influence of Indian culture into these areas was given the term Indianization. French archaeologist George Coedes defined it as the expansion of an organized culture that was framed upon Indian originations of royalty, Hinduism and Buddhism and the Sanskrit language. This can be seen in the Indianization of Southeast Asia, Hinduism in Southeast Asia and the spread of Buddhism in Southeast Asia. Indian honorifics also influenced the Malay, Thai, Filipino and Indonesian honorifics. Examples of these include raja, rani, maharlika, and datu, which were transmitted from Indian culture to Philippines via Malays and the Srivijaya empire. Indian Hindu colonists played a key role as professionals, traders, priests and warriors. Inscriptions have proved that the earliest Indian colonists who settled in Champa and the Malay archipelago, came from the Pallava dynasty, as they brought with them their Pallava script. The earliest inscriptions in Java exactly match the Pallava script. In the first stage of adoption of Indian scripts, inscriptions were made locally in Indian languages. In the second stage, the scripts were used to write the local Southeast Asian languages. In the third stage, local varieties of the scripts were developed. By the 8th century, the scripts had diverged and separated into regional scripts.

Isaac Taylor sought to show that  was introduced into the Philippines from the Coast of Bengal sometime before the 8th century. Fletcher Gardner argued that the Philippine scripts have "very great similarity" with the Brahmi script, which was supported by T. H. Pardo de Tavera.

South Sulawesi scripts 
David Diringer, accepting the view that the scripts of the Malay archipelago originate in India, writes that the South Sulawesi scripts derive from the Kawi script, probably through the medium of the Batak script of Sumatra. The Philippine scripts, according to Diringer, were possibly brought to the Philippines through the Buginese characters in Sulawesi. According to Scott, 's immediate ancestor was very likely a South Sulawesi script, probably Old Makassar or a close ancestor. South Sulawesi languages have a restricted inventory of syllable-final consonants and do not represent them in the Bugis and Makassar scripts. Sulawesi lies directly to the south of the Philippines and there is evidence of trade routes between the two.  must therefore have been developed in the Philippines in the fifteenth century CE as the Bugis-Makassar script was developed in South Sulawesi no earlier than 1400 CE.

Kawi 

The Kawi script originated in Java, descending from the Pallava script, and was used across much of Maritime Southeast Asia. The Laguna Copperplate Inscription is the earliest known written document found in the Philippines. It is a legal document with the inscribed date of Saka era 822, corresponding to 21 April 900 AD. It was written in the Kawi script in a variety of Old Malay containing numerous loanwords from Sanskrit and a few non-Malay vocabulary elements whose origin is ambiguous between Old Javanese and Old Tagalog. A second example of Kawi script can be seen on the Butuan Ivory Seal, found in the 1970s and dated between the 9th and 12th century. It is an ancient seal made of ivory that was found in an archaeological site in Butuan. The seal has been declared as a national cultural treasure. The seal is inscribed with the word Butwan in stylized Kawi. The ivory seal is now housed at the National Museum of the Philippines. One hypothesis therefore reasons that, since Kawi is the earliest attestation of writing in the Philippines, then  may have descended from Kawi.

Cham script 

 could have been introduced to the Philippines by maritime connections with the Champa Kingdom. Geoff Wade has argued that the  characters "ga", "nga", "pa", "ma", "ya" and "sa" display characteristics that can be best explained by linking them to the Cham script, rather than other Indic abugidas.  seems to be more related to other southeast Asian scripts than to Kawi script.

History
From the material that is available, it is clear that  was used in Luzon, Palawan, Mindoro, Pangasinan, Ilocos, Panay, Leyte and Iloilo, but there is no proof supporting that  reached Mindanao. It seems clear that the Luzon and Palawan varieties started to develop in different ways in the 1500s, before the Spaniards conquered what we know today as the Philippines. This puts Luzon and Palawan as the oldest regions where  was and is used. It is also notable that the script used in Pampanga had already developed special shapes for four letters by the early 1600s, different from the ones used elsewhere.

Early history

However, its authenticity has not yet been proven.

Although one of Ferdinand Magellan's shipmates, Antonio Pigafetta, wrote that the people of the Visayas were not literate in 1521, the  had already arrived there by 1567 when Miguel López de Legazpi reported from Cebu that, "They [the Visayans] have their letters and characters like those of the Malays, from whom they learned them; they write them on bamboo bark and palm leaves with a pointed tool, but never is any ancient writing found among them nor word of their origin and arrival in these islands, their customs and rites being preserved by traditions handed down from father to son without any other record." A century later, in 1668, Francisco Alcina wrote: "The characters of these natives [Visayans], or, better said, those that have been in use for a few years in these parts, an art which was communicated to them from the Tagalogs, and the latter learned it from the Borneans who came from the great island of Borneo to Manila, with whom they have considerable traffic... From these Borneans the Tagalogs learned their characters, and from them the Visayans, so they call them Moro characters or letters because the Moros taught them... [the Visayans] learned [the Moros'] letters, which many use today, and the women much more than the men, which they write and read more readily than the latter." Francisco de Santa Inés explained in 1676 why writing  was more common among women, as "they do not have any other way to while away the time, for it is not customary for little girls to go to school as boys do, they make better use of their characters than men, and they use them in things of devotion, and in other things that are not of devotion."

The Tagalog text was based mainly on a manuscript written by Fr. Juan de Placencia. Friars Domingo de Nieva and Juan de San Pedro Martyr supervised the preparation and printing of the book, which was carried out by an unnamed Chinese artisan. This is the earliest example of  that exists today and it is the only example from the 1500s. There is also a series of legal documents containing , preserved in Spanish and Philippine archives that span more than a century: the three oldest, all in the Archivo General de Indias in Seville, are from 1591 and 1599.

 was noted by the Spanish priest Pedro Chirino in 1604 and Antonio de Morga in 1609 to be known by most Filipinos, and was generally used for personal writings and poetry, among others. However, according to William Henry Scott, there were some datus from the 1590s who could not sign affidavits or oaths, and witnesses who could not sign land deeds in the 1620s.

In 1620, Libro a naisurátan amin ti bagás ti Doctrina Cristiana was written by Fr. Francisco Lopez, an Ilocano Doctrina the first Ilocano baybayin, based on the catechism written by Cardinal Belarmine. He commented the following on his decision: "The reason for putting the text of the Doctrina in Tagalog type... has been to begin the correction of the said Tagalog script, which, as it is, is so defective and confused (because of not having any method until now for expressing final consonants - I mean, those without vowels) that the most learned reader has to stop and ponder over many words to decide on the pronunciation which the writer intended." This krus-kudlít, or virama kudlít, did not catch on among  users, however. Native  experts were consulted about the new invention and were asked to adopt it and use it in all their writings. After praising the invention and showing gratitude for it, they decided that it could not be accepted into their writing because "It went against the intrinsic properties and nature that God had given their writing and that to use it was tantamount to destroy with one blow all the Syntax, Prosody and Orthography of their Tagalog language."

In 1703,  was reported to still be in use in the Comintan (Batangas and Laguna) and other areas of the Philippines.

Among the earliest literature on the orthography of Visayan languages were those of Jesuit priest Ezguerra with his  in 1747 and of Mentrida with his  in 1818 which primarily discussed grammatical structure. Based on the differing sources spanning centuries, the documented syllabaries also differed in form. 

The Ticao stone inscription, also known as the Monreal stone or Rizal stone, is a limestone tablet that contains  characters. Found by pupils of Rizal Elementary School on Ticao Island in Monreal town, Masbate, which had scraped the mud off their shoes and slippers on two irregular shaped limestone tablets before entering their classroom, they are now housed at a section of the National Museum of the Philippines, which weighs 30 kilos, is 11 centimeters thick, 54 cm long and 44 cm wide while the other is 6 cm thick, 20 cm long and 18 cm wide.

Decline
Learning the Latin alphabet also helped Filipinos to make socioeconomic progress under Spanish rule, as they could rise to relatively prestigious positions such as clerks, scribes and secretaries. By 1745,  wrote in his Arte de la lengua tagala that "The Indian [Filipino] who knows how to read [] is now rare, and rarer still is one who knows how to write []. They now all read and write in our Castilian letters [Latin alphabet]." Between 1751 and 1754, Juan José Delgado wrote that "the [native] men devoted themselves to the use of our [Latin] writing".

The complete absence of pre-Hispanic specimens of usage of the  script has led to a common misconception that fanatical Spanish priests must have burned or destroyed massive amounts of native documents. One of the scholars who proposed this theory is the anthropologist and historian H. Otley Beyer who wrote in "The Philippines before Magellan" (1921) that, "one Spanish priest in Southern Luzon boasted of having destroyed more than three hundred scrolls written in the native character". Historians have searched for the source of Beyer's claim, but no one has verified the name of the said priest. There is no direct documentary evidence of substantial destruction of native pre-Hispanic documents by Spanish missionaries, and modern scholars such as Paul Morrow and Hector Santos have accordingly rejected Beyer's suggestions. In particular, Santos suggested that only the occasional short documents of incantations, curses and spells that were deemed evil were possibly burned by the Spanish friars, and that the early missionaries only carried out the destruction of Christian manuscripts that were not acceptable to the Church. Santos rejected the idea that ancient pre-Hispanic manuscripts were systematically burned. Morrow also noted that there are no recorded instances of ancient Filipinos writing on scrolls, and that the most likely reason why no pre-Hispanic documents survived is because they wrote on perishable materials such as leaves and bamboo. He also added that it is also arguable that Spanish friars actually helped to preserve  by documenting and continuing its use even after it had been abandoned by most Filipinos.

While there were recorded at least two records of burning of Tagalog booklets of magic formulae during the early Spanish colonial period, scholar Jean Paul-Potet (2017) also commented that these booklets were written in Latin characters and not in the native  script. There are also no reports of Tagalog written scriptures, as they kept their theological knowledge unwritten and in oral form while reserving the use of the  script for secular purposes and talismans.

Contemporary descendants and revivals

The only surviving modern scripts that descended directly from the original  script through natural development are the Tagbanwa script inherited from the Tagbanwa people by the Palawan people and named Ibalnan, the Buhid script and the Hanunóo script in Mindoro. Old Kapampangan, the precolonial Indic script used to write Kapampangan, has been reformed in recent decades into the modern Kulitan script and employs consonant stacking.

Characteristics

 is an abugida (alphasyllabary), which means that it makes use of consonant-vowel combinations. Each character or titik, written in its basic form, is a consonant ending with the vowel "A". To produce consonants ending with other vowel sounds, a mark called a kudlít is placed either above the character (to produce an "E" or "I" sound) or below the character (to produce an "O" or "U" sound). To write words beginning with a vowel, three characters are used, one each for A, E/I and O/U.

Characters 

Note that the second to last row features the pamudpod virama " ᜕" (U+1715), which was introduced by Antoon Postma to the Hanunuo script. The last row of clusters with the krus-kudlít virama "+", were an addition to the original script, introduced by the Spanish priest Francisco Lopez in 1620.

There is only one symbol or character for Da or Ra as they were allophones in many languages of the Philippines, where Ra occurred in intervocalic positions and Da occurred elsewhere. The grammatical rule has survived in modern Filipino, so that when a d is between two vowels, it becomes an r, as in the words dangál (honour) and marangál (honourable), or dunong (knowledge) and marunong (knowledgeable), and even raw for daw (he said, she said, they said, it was said, allegedly, reportedly, supposedly) and rin for din (also, too) after vowels. However,  script variants like sambal, basahan, and ibalnan, to name a few, have separate symbols for Da and Ra.

The same symbol is also used to represent the Pa and Fa (or Pha), Ba and Va, and Sa and Za which were also allophonic. A single character represented nga. The current version of the Filipino alphabet still retains "ng" as a digraph. Beside these phonetic considerations, the script is monocameral and does not use letter case for distinguishing proper names or initials of words starting sentences.

Virama kudlít (krus-kudlít) 
The original writing method was particularly difficult for the Spanish priests who were translating books into the vernaculars, because originally  omitted the final consonant without a vowel. This could cause confusion for readers over which word or pronunciation a writer originally intended. For example, 'bundok' (mountain) would have been spelled as 'bu-du', with the final consonants of each syllable omitted. Because of this, Francisco López introduced his own kudlít in 1620, called a sabat or krus, that cancelled the implicit a vowel sound and which allowed a final consonant to be written. The kudlít was in the form of a "+" sign, in reference to Christianity. This cross-shaped kudlít functions exactly the same as the virama in many other Brahmic scripts. In fact, Unicode calls this kudlít "tagalog sign virama".

Virama pamudpod 

The pamudpod is part of the Hanunuo script and functions as a virama. As of Unicode 14.0, a separate pamudpod for the Baybayin script is encoded in the Tagalog Unicode block.

Punctuation and spacing 
 originally used only one punctuation mark, which was called Bantasán. Today  uses two punctuation marks, the Philippine single punctuation, acting as a comma or verse splitter in poetry, and the double punctuation, acting as a period or end of paragraph. These punctuation marks are similar to single and double danda signs in other Indic Abugidas and may be presented vertically like Indic dandas, or slanted like forward slashes. The signs are unified across Philippines scripts and were encoded by Unicode in the Hanunóo script block. Space separation of words was historically not used as words were written in a continuous flow, but is common today.

Collation 
 A, U/O, I/E; Ha, Pa, Ka, Sa, La, Ta, Na, Ba, Ma, Ga, Da/Ra, Ya, NGa, Wa.
 In Unicode the letters are collated in coherence with other Indic scripts, by phonetic proximity for consonants:
 A, I/E, U/O; Ka, Ga, Nga; Ta, Da/Ra, Na; Pa, Ba, Ma; Ya, Ra, La, Wa, Sa, Ha.

Usage

Pre-colonial and colonial usage
 historically was used in Tagalog and to a lesser extent Kapampangan-speaking areas. Its use spread to the Ilocanos when the Spanish promoted its use with the printing of Bibles.  was noted by the Spanish priest Pedro Chirino in 1604 and Antonio de Morga in 1609 to be known by most Filipinos, stating that there is hardly a man and much less a woman, who does not read and write in the letters used in the "island of Manila". It was noted that they did not write books or keep records, but used  for personal writings like small notes and messages, poetry and signing documents.

Traditionally,  was written upon palm leaves with styli or upon bamboo with knives, the writing tools were called panulat. Once the letters were carved into the bamboo, it was wiped with ash to make the characters stand out more. An anonymous source from 1590 states:

 

During the era of Spanish colonization, most  began being written with ink on paper using a sharpened quill, or printed in books (using the woodcut technique) to facilitate the spread of Christianity. In some parts of the country like Mindoro the traditional writing technique has been retained. The scholar Isaac Donoso claims that the documents written in the native language and in  played a significant role in the judicial and legal life of the colony.

Modern usage

A number of legislative bills have been proposed periodically aiming to promote the writing system, among them is the "National Writing System Act" (House Bill 1022/Senate Bill 433). It is used in the most current New Generation Currency series of the Philippine peso issued in the last quarter of 2010. The word used on the bills was "Pilipino".

It is also used in Philippine passports, specifically the latest e-passport edition issued 11 August 2009 onwards. The odd pages of pages 3–43 have "" (""/"Righteousness exalts a nation") in reference to Proverbs 14:34.

Examples

The Lord's Prayer (Ama Namin)

Universal Declaration of Human Rights

Motto of the Philippines

National anthem 
Below are the first two verses of the Philippine national anthem, Lupang Hinirang, in Baybayin.

Example sentences

Unicode 
 was added to the Unicode Standard in March, 2002 with the release of version 3.2.

Block

 is included in Unicode under the name 'Tagalog'.

Tagalog Unicode range: U+1700–U+171F

Keyboard

Gboard 

The virtual keyboard app Gboard developed by Google for Android and iOS devices was updated on 1 August 2019 its list of supported languages. This includes all Unicode  blocks. Included are "Buhid", "Hanunuo", baybayin as "Filipino (Baybayin)", and the Tagbanwa script as "Aborlan". The baybayin layout, "Filipino (Baybayin)", is designed such that when the user presses the character, vowel markers (kudlít) for e/i and o/u, as well as the virama (vowel sound cancellation) are selectable.

Philippines Unicode Keyboard Layout with  
It is possible to type  directly from one's keyboard without the need to use web applications which implement an input method. The Philippines Unicode Keyboard Layout includes different sets of  layout for different keyboard users: QWERTY, Capewell-Dvorak, Capewell-QWERF 2006, Colemak, and Dvorak, all of which work in both Microsoft Windows and Linux.

This keyboard layout with  can be downloaded here.

See also

Filipino orthography
Suyat
Buhid script
Hanuno'o script
Tagbanwa script
Kulitan
Basahan
Kawi
Laguna Copperplate Inscription
Tagalog language

 Old Tagalog

History of Indian influence on Southeast Asia

 Abugida

See multilingual support for fonts supporting Hanunó'o

Notes

References

Works cited

External links
House Bill 160, aka the National Script Act of 2011
Tagalog – Unicode character table
Baybayin Modern Fonts
Paul Morrow's Baybayin Fonts

Brahmic scripts
Philippine scripts
Tagalog language
Obsolete writing systems
Filipino language